Yokohama Shopping Street 6-Man Tag Team Championship is a professional wrestling six-man tag team championship owned by the Big Japan Pro Wrestling (BJW) promotion. The title was created on August 4, 2012. As the name suggests, the title is usually defended in the Yokohama shopping street area. The title was first announced in May 2012 and the first champions were crowned when the team of Kazuki Hashimoto, Takumi Tsukamoto and Yuji Okabayashi defeated Yoshihito Sasaki, Shinya Ishikawa and Masashi Otani in a six-man tag team match. 

There have been a total of 41 reigns shared between 28 different teams consisting of 41 distinctive champions. The current champions are Abdullah Kobayashi, Daiju Wakamatsu and Kankuro Hoshino who are in their first reign as a team.

Title history

Combined reigns

By team  

{|class="wikitable sortable" style="text-align: center"
!Rank
!Team
!data-sort-type="number"|No. ofreigns
!data-sort-type="number"|Combineddefenses
!data-sort-type="number"|Combined days
|-
!1
| Chicharito Shoki, Yasufumi Nakanoue and Yuji Okabayashi || 1 || 6 || 599
|-
!2
|Akira Hyodo, Daisuke Sekimoto and Takuho Kato || 1 || 5 || 450
|-
!3
||Heisei Gokudo Combi  || 1 || 1 || 338
|-
!4
||,  and  || 1 || 0 || 310
|-
!5
||,  and Takayuki Ueki || 1 || 5 || 295
|-
!6
|3rd Generation Chimidoro Brothers (Takayuki Ueki and ) || 8 || 13 || 246
|-
!7
|,  and  || 1 || 3 || 220
|-
!8
| Daichi Hashimoto, Hideyoshi Kamitani and Yuya Aoki || 1 || 4 || 208
|-
!9
||,  and  || 1 || 1 || 197
|-
!10
||,  and  || 1 || 0 || 141
|-
!11
||,  and  || 1 || 0 || 127
|-
!12
||,  and  || 1 || 0 || 125
|-
!13
||,  and  || 4 || 12 || 87
|-
!14
|Abdullah Kobayashi, Drew Parker and  || 2 || 3 || 69
|-
!15
||,  and Takayuki Ueki || 1 || 0 || 35
|-
!16
||,  and  || 1 || 0 || 35
|-
!17
| Ryota Hama, Takeshi Irei and Yasufumi Nakanoue || 1 || 0 || 29
|-
!18
|Sento Minzoku  || 1 || 0 || 27
|-
!19
| Ryuji Ito, Takashi Sasaki and Yuko Miyamoto || 1 || 0 || 25
|-
!20
||,  and  || 2 || 0 || 23
|-
!21
|Moon Vulcan  <small>(and ) || 1 || 0 || 19
|-
!rowspan=2|22
| Abdullah Kobayashi, Jaki Numazawa and Yuko Miyamoto || 1 || 0 || 6
|-
|FUMA, SAGAT and  || 1 || 0 || 6
|-
!24
||,  and  || 2 || 0 || 4
|-
!25
| Daichi Hashimoto, Hideyoshi Kamitani and Ryuichi Kawakami || 1 || 0 || 3
|-
!rowspan=2|26
|Jaki Numazawa, Ryuji Ito and Yuko Miyamoto || 1 || 0 || 1
|-
||,  and Ryuji Ito || 1 || 0 || 1
|-
!28
|style="background-color: #ffe6bd"| Abdullah Kobayashi, Daiju Wakamatsu and Kankuro Hoshino † || 1 || 0 || +
|-

By wrestler  

{|class="wikitable sortable" style="text-align: center"
!Rank
!Wrestler
!data-sort-type="number"|No. ofreigns
!data-sort-type="number"|Combineddefenses
!data-sort-type="number"|Combined days
|-
!1
| Yasufumi Nakanoue || 7 || 19 || 912
|-
!2
| Daisuke Sekimoto || 5 || 5 || 889
|-
!3
| Yuji Okabayashi || 3 || 9 || 837
|-
!4
| Chicharito Shoki || 1 || 6 || 599
|-
!5
| Takayuki Ueki || 10 || 18 || 576
|-
!6
| Masaya Takahashi || 9 || 18 || 541
|-
!7
|style="background-color: #ffe6bd"| Abdullah Kobayashi † || 9 || 9 || +
|-
!8
|style="background-color: #ffe6bd"| Kankuro Hoshino † || 3 || 1 || +
|-
!9
| Ryuji Ito || 5 || 0 || 464
|-
!10
| Jaki Numazawa || 5 || 1 || 459
|-
!rowspan=2|11
| Akira Hyodo || 1 || 5 || 450
|-
| Takuho Kato || 1 || 5 ||450
|-
!13
| Hideyoshi Kamitani || 5 || 4 || 384
|-
!14
| Shinya Ishikawa || 2 || 3 || 347
|-
!rowspan=2|15
| Great Kojika || 1 || 1 || 338
|-
| Masato Inaba || 1 || 1 || 338
|-
!17
| Ryota Hama || 6 || 13 || 313
|-
!18
| Toshiyuki Sakuda || 8 || 13 || 246
|-
!19
| Ryuichi Kawakami || 2 || 3 || 223
|-
!20
| Daichi Hashimoto || 4 || 4 || 215
|-
!21
| Yuya Aoki || 1 || 4 || 208
|-
!22
| Yoshihisa Uto || 9 || 12 || 198
|-
!23
| Shogun Okamoto || 1 || 1 || 197
|-
!24
| Kazuki Hashimoto || 2 || 0 || 176
|-
!25
| Kohei Sato || 1 || 0 || 125
|-
!26
| Drew Parker || 2 || 3 || 69
|-
!27
| Hideki Suzuki || 3 || 0 || 42
|-
!rowspan=3|28
| Brahman Kei || 1 || 0 || 35
|-
| Brahman Shu || 1 || 0 || 35
|-
| Takumi Tsukamoto || 1 || 0 || 35
|-
!31
| Yuko Miyamoto || 3 || 1 || 32
|-
!32
| Takeshi Irei || 1 || 0 || 29
|-
!rowspan=3|33
| Isami Kodaka || 1 || 0 || 27
|-
| Minoru Fujita || 1 || 0 || 27
|-
| Ryuichi Sekine || 1 || 0 || 27
|-
!36
| Takashi Sasaki || 1 || 0 || 25
|-
!37
| Takuya Nomura || 1 || 0 || 19
|-
!rowspan=3|38
| FUMA || 1 || 0 || 6
|-
| SAGAT || 1 || 0 || 6
|-
| Yusuke Kubo || 1 || 0 || 6
|-
!41
|style="background-color: #ffe6bd"| Daiju Wakamatsu † || 1 || 0 || +

See also
KO-D 6-Man Tag Team Championship
Open the Triangle Gate Championship
UWA World Trios Championship
NEVER Openweight 6-Man Tag Team Championship

References
General

Specific

External links
Big Japan Pro Wrestling official website

Big Japan Pro Wrestling championships
Trios wrestling tag team championships